Leave Right Now is a compilation album by British singer-songwriter Will Young. It was released by Jive Records and 19 Entertainment exclusively in Canada and the United States where it served as debut. The album contains eight tracks from three of his first four studio albums, Friday's Child (2002), Keep On (2003) and Let It Go (2005). Leave Right Now reached number 13 on the US Heatseekers chart.

Critical reception

AllMusic editor Stephen Thomas Erlewine remarked that "Young specializes in super-slick soft rock and super-stiff white funk, doing neither with the panache of either Mick Hucknall or George Michael [...] Young has no chance of replicating his idols with Leave Right Now, not just because most of it is almost a half-decade old, but because he’s a prissy milquetoast whose distinguishing vocal tic is how he occasionally gets a mildly sharp edge to his voice when he's holding a high note. Not the kind of thing you want to hang your hat on, and not the kind of thing that will win audiences that didn’t see you on TV, either."

Track listing

Charts

Release history

References

2010 greatest hits albums
Will Young albums
Song recordings produced by Stephen Lipson
Albums produced by Richard Stannard (songwriter)
Albums produced by Ash Howes